Fancy Pants is a 1950 American romantic comedy western film directed by George Marshall and starring Bob Hope and Lucille Ball. It is a musical adaptation of Ruggles of Red Gap.

Plot
A British actor attempts to impress two visiting American women, Efflie Floud and her tomboyish daughter, Agatha, by having the cast of his drawing-room comedy pose as his aristocratic family. Effie persuades the 'butler', Humphrey, really a struggling American actor named Arthur Tyler, to accompany them to the United States and help to refine both her husband and daughter. She sends a telegram home, referring to the person she believes is Humphrey as a "gentleman's gentleman", which the rural western townfolk misunderstand as meaning he is an aristocrat and presumably the future husband of Agatha. Arthur must now pretend to the family that he is this British butler while pretending to the rest of the town, and the visiting President Theodore Roosevelt that he is a politically savvy Englishman.

The deception is eventually uncovered, and the actor and the family's daughter gradually fall in love.

Cast
 Bob Hope as Humphrey  Arthur Tyler
 Lucille Ball as Agatha Floud
 Annette Warren provides the singing voice for Agatha Floud
 Bruce Cabot as Cart Belknap
 Jack Kirkwood as Mike Floud
 Lea Penman as Effie Floud
 Hugh French as George Van Basingwell
 Eric Blore as Sir Wimbley
 Joseph Vitale as Wampum
 John Alexander as Teddy Roosevelt
 Norma Varden as Lady Maude
 Virginia Keiley as Rosalind
 Colin Keith-Johnston as Twombley
 Joe Wong as Wong
 Olaf Hytten as stage manager (uncredited)

See also
 List of American films of 1950

References

External links
 
 
 
 

1950 films
1950 romantic comedy films
1950s English-language films
1950s historical comedy films
1950s historical romance films
American historical comedy films
American historical romance films
American romantic comedy films
1950s Western (genre) comedy films
Cultural depictions of Theodore Roosevelt
Films based on American novels
Films directed by George Marshall
Films set in the 1900s
Films set in England
Films set in New Mexico
Musical film remakes
Paramount Pictures films
1950s American films